Marcos Barrera (born 2 March 1984) is an Argentine footballer playing as a centre back for Huracán Las Heras.

External links
 
 

1984 births
Living people
Argentine footballers
Argentine expatriate footballers
Godoy Cruz Antonio Tomba footballers
Universitario de Sucre footballers
C.D. Jorge Wilstermann players
2 de Mayo footballers
Deportes Iquique footballers
The Strongest players
Deportivo Municipal footballers
Club San José players
Club Always Ready players
Argentine Primera División players
Bolivian Primera División players
Peruvian Primera División
Chilean Primera División players
Super League Greece players
Argentine expatriate sportspeople in Chile
Argentine expatriate sportspeople in Bolivia
Argentine expatriate sportspeople in Paraguay
Argentine expatriate sportspeople in Greece
Argentine expatriate sportspeople in Peru
Expatriate footballers in Chile
Expatriate footballers in Bolivia
Expatriate footballers in Paraguay
Expatriate footballers in Greece
Expatriate footballers in Peru
Association football defenders
Sportspeople from Mendoza, Argentina